Urvara  উর্বর is the third-largest confirmed crater on Ceres after Kerwan and neighboring Yalode. Urvara means fertile. It is named after the ancient Indo-Iranian personification of fertility (plants in the Avesta, fertile fields in the Rig Veda). It has a central peak, and a number of unexplained ridges intersect it.

See also
List of geological features on Ceres

References

Impact craters on asteroids
Surface features of Ceres